The Unitarian Universalist Church is a historic church at 325 Habersham Street in Savannah, Georgia, United States. It is located in the northwestern civic block of Troup  Square. It was designed by noted architect John S. Norris in 1851 and built with funds left in his will by Moses Eastman, a local silversmith and councillor.<ref>Savannah in the Old South, Walter J. Fraser (2003), p. 196</ref> 

The Christmas carol "Jingle Bells" was written by the church's music director James Lord Pierpont (1822–1893), supposedly while living in Savannah."Savannah Unitarian Universalist Church celebrates ‘Jingle Bells’ at annual festival" – Savannah Morning News, December 24, 2017 The city of Medford, Massachusetts, also claims that the song was written there in 1850, but it has been proven that Pierpont had moved to the west coast to partake in the California Gold Rush at that point. What is known is that he copyrighted'' the song, with the name "The One Horse Open Sleigh", on September 16, 1857, while he was living in Savannah.

The church was physically moved from Oglethorpe Square to the western side of Troup Square, a distance of a third of a mile, in 1860.

Gallery

References

External links
 Unitarian Universalist Church of Savannah – official site
 A History of the Unitarian-Universalist Church of Savannah – Unitarian-Universalist Church of Savannah

Landmarks in Savannah, Georgia
Churches in Savannah, Georgia
Troup Square buildings
Churches completed in 1851
Religious organizations established in 1851
1851 establishments in Georgia (U.S. state)
Savannah Historic District